Nabawiyya Mohamed Musa Badawia(December 17, 1886 – April 30, 1951) was an Egyptian Nationalist and Feminist and is recognized as one of the founding feminists of the 20th century in Egypt. Her career and life is often discussed alongside figures such as Huda Sharawi and Malak Hifni Nasif, as all three of these women gave lectures and put on other events to further education, promote health, and reduce sexual exploitation for women, among other things. She grew up in Alexandria and was part of the Egyptian middle-class. Along with being an avid educator, she was a prolific writer. She wrote and published articles such as "al-Ayat al–badyyina fi tarbiya al-banat" (a treatise on girls' education) in 1902, "al-Mar’a wa-l-‘amal" (Woman and Work) in 1920 as well as editing a woman's page for al-Balagh al-usbui (The Weekly News). She is known as the first Egyptian woman to obtain a baccalaureate secondary degree, and her writings are considered important historical documents reflecting the periods of Egyptian history her life spanned, especially Egyptian life under rule of the British protectorate.

Education
Nabawiya Mohamed Musa Badawia was a Zagazigi fallahi (peasant) woman who exhibited strong principles of nationalism and feminism even as a young woman. She stood for the rights of her nation and fellow Egyptian women. Nabawiya's father was an Egyptian officer who once went to a mission to Sudan, never to return.<ref>{{citation|url=https://www.marefa.org/نبوية_موسى|title=Nabawiya Musa- Full biography}}</ref> She, her brother, and her mother (now a widow) thereafter moved to Cairo for her brother's sake, to continue his schooling.

Nabawiyya Musa was one of the first and last women to complete the education exam and be accepted into the Saniyya School under colonial rule, due to fears at the time of women's empowerment in a patriarchal society. In her childhood, her brother helped her learn to read and write at home, and she was self-taught at maths. By the time she turned thirteen, she was keen on continuing her education in school, but her family refused. Defying the established social norms of the time, she stole her mother's stamp and sold her gold bracelet to apply for school, continuing her studies secretly against her family's wishes.

She finished her high school education in 1907 to become the first girl ever to finish high school in Egypt. In 1908, she finished her degree in education and went on to be a prominent educator for the middle-class and an advocate for women's rights. It was not until after 1922 that more women were let into the newly established Egyptian University; by this time Nabawiyya Musa was a key lecturer and leader among her colleagues.3 Nabawiyya was notably the first Egyptian woman to go to high school.

Career
Nabawiyya Musa was an avid writer and educator who gave lectures around Egypt advocating for the education of women. She believed strongly that educated women would only improve the state by being able to be independent, bring in money for the household as middle-class women and/or raise their children to be independent so they could grow up to be assets to society. She believed strongly that the lack of hierarchy in the peasant and lower classes was a good model of how women can be an asset to productivity via equal opportunities with men. She knew that the differences between men and women were nothing but a social construct and could easily be broken with time. Through promoting women's education, she sought to end sexual violence against women. She believed that  giving women an equal status in the workforce and in education would make them less vulnerable and less prone to sexual violence.

She helped found a woman's magazine in Egypt called majallat al-fata'' ("the young woman's magazine") to which she contributed an autobiographical column called "my memoirs" from 1938-1942. These essays she later compiled into a book under the title "My history, by my pen."

Feminist movement
Nabawiyya Musa was an integral part in the feminist movement in Egypt. She stood out because many of her views echoed very strong Egyptian Nationalism as well as equal opportunities for women. Along with highlighting the education of women, she was also a leading role model in breaking down the social constructs of women. She and her partners in the feminist movement believed that a radical call for unveiling of women was not needed in the beginning of the movement because Egypt was not ready to accept it. However, after attending a conference in Rome in 1923, she, along with Huda Shaarawi and Ceza Nabarawi, came back to Egypt unveiled as a proclamation to Egyptian society.

Death
Musa died on April 30, 1951.

References

1886 births
1951 deaths
Egyptian feminists
Egyptian nationalists
People from Sharqia Governorate
Egyptian revolutionaries
Social constructionism
Egyptian suffragists
20th-century Egyptian women politicians
20th-century Egyptian politicians